The Saya de Malha Bank (also the Sahia de Malha Bank, modern Portuguese: saia de malha, English: mesh skirt) or Mesh Skirt Bank, is one of the largest submerged ocean banks in the world, a part of the vast undersea Mascarene Plateau.

Geography
The Saya de Malha Bank lies northeast of Madagascar, southeast of Seychelles, and north of Nazareth Bank, the Cargados Carajos Shoals, and the island of Mauritius, and currently falls mostly under international waters. Mauritius administers the whole Saya de Malha Bank as a portion of it lies within its exclusive economic zone.

If the South Bank were recognized as a submerged atoll structure, it would be the largest of the world, almost three times the size of the Great Chagos Bank, commonly considered the largest atoll structure of the world. Even smaller North Bank would be one of the largest atolls worldwide. The North Bank and the South Bank appear to have different origins, since they are separated by a fault. The South Bank and the Great Chagos Bank were one single feature until about 64 to 69 million years ago, when an ocean ridge opened between them and started pushing them apart.

The banks are covered with sea grass interspersed with small coral reefs. Due to its remote location, the bank is among the least-studied shallow marine ecoregions on the planet. The banks are a breeding ground for humpback whales and blue whales.

Geology 
The bank was formed 35 million years ago by the Réunion hotspot, and is composed of basaltic basal rock overlain with limestone. The limestone banks found on the plateau are the remnants of coral reefs. Millions of years ago, the bank was one or more mountainous volcanic islands, like present-day Mauritius and Réunion, which subsequently sank below the waves. Some of the banks may have been low islands as recently as 18,000-6,000 years ago, when sea levels were up to  lower during the most recent ice age.

History
The bank was named by Portuguese explorers 500 years ago, who encountered the bank on the voyage between the Cape of Good Hope and India. After traversing miles of deep blue Indian Ocean, they found themselves sailing above a shallow area of the bank, covered with swaying green seagrass.

The first scientific survey of the bank was undertaken by Captain Robert Moresby of the Royal Navy in 1838. Moresby previously surveyed the Laccadives, the Red Sea, the Maldives and the Chagos Banks. Due to Moresby's ill health, the Saya de Malha bank was his last survey in a long and brilliant career exploring and charting the archipelagos and reefs of the Indian Ocean.

Artificial island project 
The Saya de Malha Bank is the site of an attempt to create an artificial island by Prof. Wolf Hilbertz (1938-2007) and Dr. Thomas J. Goreau. Hilbertz created seacrete or biorock by utilizing electricity to accrete the minerals in sea water onto a metal structure. The artificial coral thus far created has high enough tensile strength to be used as building material. With others, Hilbertz and Goreau made two expeditions to the bank in 1997 and 2002. Some sources say that the island would have been named Autopia or Autopia Saya, and declared a micronation.

Excerpt from an online interview with Wolf Hilbertz in Celestopea Times, 2004:

Mauritius claims part of the Saya de Malha Bank as part of its exclusive economic zone.

See also 
 Hawkins Bank
 Nazareth Bank
 Robert Moresby
 Soudan Banks

References

External links
 Saya de Malha Bank (Lighthouse Foundation)

Landforms of Mauritius
Marine ecoregions
Fishing areas of the Indian Ocean
Artificial islands
Outer Islands of Mauritius
Micronations
Undersea banks of the Indian Ocean
Western Indo-Pacific